The Descon Formation is a geologic formation in Alaska. It preserves fossils dating back to the Silurian period.

See also

 List of fossiliferous stratigraphic units in Alaska
 Paleontology in Alaska

References
 

Silurian Alaska
Silurian southern paleotropical deposits